Yoo-Hoo may refer to:
 Yoo-hoo, an American chocolate-flavored beverage
 The YooHoo & Friends stuffed toy line
 The 2009 and 2012 YooHoo & Friends television series
 YooHoo to the Rescue, another series related to YooHoo & Friends

Music
Songs
 "YooHoo", Al Jolson and Buddy DeSylva song
 "Yoo-Hoo!", song by Stephen Sondheim
 "YooHoo (Secret song)", a song by South Korean band Secret from their 2013 mini-album Letter from Secret
 "Minnie's Yoo-Hoo", a 1930 song written for the Mickey Mouse cartoon Mickey's Follies.
 "Yoo-Hoo", a song by Imperial Teen from their 1999 album What Is Not to Love
 "Yoo-Hoo", a song by Danger Mouse and Jemini from their 2003 album Ghetto Pop Life
 The Pinky Lee Show theme song "Yoo-hoo it's me/My name is Pinky Lee/I skip and run with lots of fun/For every he and she.." 
 "Yoo Hoo", 1941 song by Ethel Crowninshield used to teach children to sing in 1950s and 1960s